Straightener may refer to:

 Straightener (band), Japanese alternative rock band
 A straightening iron, a kind of hair iron
 Any substance used in hair straightening
 A shaft straightener, a device used in making an arrow or spear
 Flow straightener, a key element of a wind tunnel
 Straightener (metalworking), a device used in metalworking to straighten material before it is fed to a stamping press
 "Wheels of Confusion/The Straightener", a song from Black Sabbath Vol. 4